Storm of Love is a 1929 German silent film directed by Martin Berger and starring Marcella Albani, Nikolai Malikoff, and Boris Michailow.

The film's sets were designed by Max Knaake.

Cast

References

Bibliography

External links

1929 films
Films of the Weimar Republic
German silent feature films
Films directed by Martin Berger
German black-and-white films